Patrick Timothy Kane II (born November 19, 1988) is an American professional ice hockey right winger for the New York Rangers of the National Hockey League (NHL). He was selected by the Chicago Blackhawks with the first overall pick in the 2007 NHL Entry Draft. Kane also represented the United States at the 2010 and 2014 Winter Olympics.

Kane has won three Stanley Cups as a member of the Blackhawks, in 2010, 2013 and 2015, winning the Conn Smythe Trophy as the most valuable player of the playoffs in 2013. Kane won the Hart Memorial Trophy as most valuable player and Art Ross Trophy as scoring champion in the 2015–16 NHL season. Kane, who led the NHL with 106 points (46 goals, 60 assists), is the first American-born player to win the Art Ross Trophy as the NHL's scoring leader. He was also the first American-born player to win the Hart Trophy. In 2017, he was named one of the 100 Greatest NHL Players. On January 19, 2020, Kane became the youngest U.S. player to reach 1,000 career regular-season points.

Playing career

Minor and junior
At age 14, Kane played junior hockey for the USA Bobcats, scoring many goals and earning the title of MVP. Kane relocated to Michigan, where he lived with former NHL player Pat Verbeek, having been convinced to play for the Honeybaked AAA hockey club in Detroit. The club is a part of the Midwest Elite Hockey League. Kane's career with Honeybaked lasted for three years.

The London Knights drafted Kane in the fifth round, 88th overall, in the 2004 Ontario Hockey League Midget Draft, but he chose not to play for the Knights until the 2006–07 season. Instead, he played for the United States U-18 National Team Development Program (NTDP), where he led the team in scoring with 102 points during the 2005–06 season, surpassing the previous record holder, Phil Kessel. Playing on a line with Sergei Kostitsyn and Sam Gagner the following season with London, he scored 145 points for the OHL scoring title and combined with Gagner and Kostitsyn for 394 points.

Kane and the Knights finished the playoffs by losing in the OHL's Western Conference final to the Plymouth Whalers in a 4–1 best-of-seven series. He finished his playoff campaign with 10 goals and 21 assists for 31 points in 16 games.

On April 27, 2007, Kane was announced as the winner of the Emms Family Award for the OHL rookie of the year. He was also named runner-up to John Tavares for the Red Tilson Trophy as league MVP.

Chicago Blackhawks (2007–2023)
Heading into the 2007 NHL Entry Draft, Kane was ranked first among North American prospects by the NHL Central Scouting Bureau and was chosen first overall by the Chicago Blackhawks. The St. Louis Blues offered to trade the Blackhawks their 9th, 24th and 26th overall picks in the 2007 Draft in order to acquire Chicago's first overall selection and draft Kane. On July 25, 2007, Blackhawks' general manager Dale Tallon announced that they had signed Kane to a three-year contract. Kane threw the ceremonial first pitch at a Chicago Cubs game on June 25, 2007, at Wrigley Field. Kane later joined Denis Savard, the Blackhawks' coach, in singing "Take Me Out to the Ball Game". Kane also threw the first pitch at a Buffalo Bisons (AAA) game in August.

Kane made his NHL debut on October 4, 2007, against the Minnesota Wild. He recorded his first assist and first shootout goal (a game-winner) two days later against Dominik Hašek of the Detroit Red Wings. He scored his first NHL goal on October 19, beating José Théodore of the Colorado Avalanche. With a quick start to his rookie campaign, on November 2, Kane was named the NHL Rookie of the Month for October after scoring 5 goals and 11 assists in 12 games. On December 15, Kane and the Blackhawks visited the Buffalo Sabres to mark Kane's first return to Buffalo as a professional hockey player. Kane received a special cheer from his hometown and a special ceremony was held before the game. The Blackhawks lost the game 3–1, with Kane scoring their lone goal. Kane finished his first NHL campaign atop the rookie scoring race with 72 points. On June 12, 2008, he received the Calder Memorial Trophy, awarded to the NHL's rookie of the year, finishing ahead of teammate Jonathan Toews and Washington Capitals forward Nicklas Bäckström.

The following season, Kane and Toews helped lead a rejuvenated Blackhawks team back to the Stanley Cup playoffs. After recording 70 points in the regular season, Kane scored his first career hat-trick in the 2009 playoffs against the Vancouver Canucks in the second round on May 11, 2009. The Blackhawks won the game 7–5, clinching their spot in the Western Conference Finals for the first time since 1995. After the game, Kane told the Chicago Sun-Times that he was "fired up" after Canucks defenseman Willie Mitchell claimed that Kane "couldn't play five-on-five". He finished his first NHL playoffs with 14 points in 16 games as the Blackhawks were eliminated in the Western Conference Finals by the Detroit Red Wings.

In May 2009, the Chicago Tribune reported that Kane would be the cover athlete for EA Sports' NHL 10. In the final season of his initial rookie contract, on December 3, 2009, Kane signed a reported five-year, $31.5 million contract extension with Chicago. The deal was announced simultaneously with contract extensions to both Toews and defenseman Duncan Keith.

In the  season, Kane finished with a career-high 88 points to rank ninth in the NHL in scoring. The Blackhawks finished first in the Central Division and second in the Western Conference. They advanced to the 2010 Stanley Cup Finals. On June 9, 2010, in game six of the Finals, Kane scored the overtime winner when he shot the puck under the pads of Philadelphia Flyers goaltender Michael Leighton and into the net, winning the Blackhawks the Stanley Cup. The goal ended a 49-year Stanley Cup drought for the Blackhawks.

During the 2010–11 season, Kane was selected as an alternate captain for the 2011 NHL All-Star Game.

During the 2012–13 NHL lockout, Kane played overseas, signing a contract on October 24, 2012, to play for Swiss club EHC Biel. In 20 National League A games, Kane scored 13 goals and had 10 assists alongside Tyler Seguin, Biel's second NHL player. Kane also played for HC Davos in the 2012 Spengler Cup.

When the lockout ended and play began in the 2012–13 season in January 2013, Jonathan Toews tied Kane for the team lead in goals with 23. Kane finished the season as the team leader in assists (32) and points (55). Kane scored his second career playoff hat-trick in the 2013 playoffs against the Los Angeles Kings in double overtime of Game 5 of the Western Conference Finals on June 8, 2013. That goal (scored at 11:40 in double overtime) advanced the team to the 2013 Stanley Cup Finals against the Boston Bruins. It was Kane's second Stanley Cup Final appearance. The Blackhawks would win the Cup Finals in six games, and Kane contributed by scoring three goals (one in Game 4 and two in Game 5) to win the 2013 Conn Smythe Trophy as the Stanley Cup Playoffs MVP.

On March 19, 2014, Kane injured his left leg following a collision with Brenden Morrow in a game against the St. Louis Blues. He missed the remainder of the regular season but returned for the 2014 playoffs. During the playoffs, he recorded a team-high 20 points in 19 games with 8 goals and 12 assists. As part of that run, on May 2, in Game 1 of Blackhawks' Western Conference Semifinals, Kane scored two goals, including the game-winning goal while coining his nickname "Showtime". On July 9, 2014, the Blackhawks announced that Kane and Jonathan Toews had both signed eight-year contract extensions, set to start running on July 1, 2015, with an annual average value of $10.5 million.

During the 2014–15 season, Kane emerged as one of the NHL's leading scorers. He was elected to the 2015 NHL All-Star Game in Columbus, Ohio. He scored 64 points (27 goals and 37 assists) through the regular season. He injured his left clavicle on February 24, 2015, after he was cross-checked into the boards while stumbling towards the ice by Alex Petrovic in a game against the Florida Panthers. Kane underwent surgery and was expected to miss 12 weeks. At the time of his injury, he was leading the NHL in points. However, he recovered earlier than initially projected and returned to the Blackhawks at the start of the 2015 playoffs. Chicago head coach Joel Quenneville moved Kane to the Blackhawks' top line alongside Jonathan Toews and Brandon Saad after the Anaheim Ducks took a 3–2 game lead in the Western Conference Finals. The trio combined for nine points over the final two games and propelled the Blackhawks to the Stanley Cup Finals. Kane helped the Blackhawks defeat the Tampa Bay Lightning by assisting on Duncan Keith's game-winning goal in Game 6 and scoring an insurance goal for his third Stanley Cup championship in six years. Kane finished the playoffs with 11 goals and 12 assists, tying the Lightning's Tyler Johnson with a playoff-high 23 points.

Following the off-season departures of Saad and Brad Richards, the Blackhawks acquired rookie winger Artemi Panarin and veteran center Artem Anisimov to join Kane on the second line for the 2015–16 season. Kane recorded a 26-game point streak between October and December, during which he tallied 16 goals and 24 assists. This was the longest streak by any American-born skater, and the longest point-streak in Blackhawks history. Kane was selected to the 2016 NHL All-Star Game as the captain of the Central Division team. On April 1, 2016, Kane reached the 40-goal mark for the first time in his NHL career when he scored a late goal in the second period of a 5–4 overtime victory against the Winnipeg Jets. Kane also won the Ted Lindsay Award, given to the NHL's most outstanding player as voted by the National Hockey League Players' Association (NHLPA).

Kane continued his success with Panarin during the 2016–17 season. He finished the season with 89 points, finishing second in the NHL behind Connor McDavid and tied with Sidney Crosby. Kane was selected to play on the NHL's Central Division team for the 2017 NHL All-Star Game. However, Kane and the Blackhawks were swept by the Nashville Predators during the first round of the 2017 playoffs. Kane only tallied one goal and assist during the series. During the ensuing off-season, Panarin was traded to the Columbus Blue Jackets in a four-player deal in exchange for Brandon Saad. In the off-season, Kane was named in the 100 Greatest NHL Players list for NHL's Centennial Anniversary.

Kane recorded the first five-point game of his NHL career on January 9, 2018, against the Ottawa Senators. He was selected to play in the 2018 NHL All-Star Game. On January 20, 2018, in a game against the New York Islanders, Kane recorded his 800th career point, becoming only the fifth player in franchise history to reach that milestone.

On January 19, 2020, against the Winnipeg Jets, Kane scored his 1,000th NHL career point, assisting on a goal by Brandon Saad. Kane became the fourth player in Blackhawks franchise history to reach that mark with the club, along with Stan Mikita, Bobby Hull and Denis Savard. During the season, the Blackhawks appointed Kane as an alternate captain after Brent Seabrook missed the remainder of the season due to multiple surgeries.

Kane retained his role as an alternate captain going into 2020–21 NHL season. He scored 15 goals and tallied 51 assists for a team-high 66 points. He finished with the fifth-most points among all skaters in the NHL for the season. On February 28, 2021, Kane recorded his 400th career goal against the Detroit Red Wings, becoming the 100th player in NHL history to reach 400 career goals. On March 9, Kane played in his 1,000th career game and became only the seventh player in franchise history to reach the milestone. After the season's conclusion, Kane was named the Best NHL Player at the 2021 ESPY Awards.

Kane appeared in 78 games for the Blackhawks during the 2021–22 NHL season where he recorded 26 goals and 66 assists despite playing with a persistent undisclosed injury. Kane's 92 points marked the third-highest scoring season of his career. As he approached the final season of his current contract in Chicago, Kane commented on his future with the team, stating, "I know in the game of hockey there's not many guys that have played their whole career with one team, so it would be a privilege and an honor to do that, but I guess we'll see how it all plays out."

New York Rangers (2023–present)
On February 28, 2023, Kane's 15-year tenure with the Blackhawks ended as he and prospect Cooper Zech were traded to the New York Rangers in exchange for a conditional second-round pick in the 2023 NHL Entry Draft,  a fourth-round pick, and defenseman Andy Welinski. To help facilitate the trade, the Rangers sent the Arizona Coyotes a fifth-round selection in the 2025 draft.

International play

Kane has competed internationally for the United States. He first represented the United States in the 2006 IIHF U18 Championships, in which he led the tournament in scoring with 12 points (five goals and seven assists) in only six games played. His two points per game pace led the United States to the gold medal and earned him individual all-star team honors.

The next year, he moved onto the United States' U20 team at the 2007 World Juniors. He was one of only three players on the team playing major junior hockey. He continued his international pace with five goals and four assists in seven games to finish second in tournament scoring and, once again, garner an all-star team selection. His team did not perform as well as his U18 team, but they did manage to go home with the bronze medal. After making the NHL and being unable to play in the 2008 WJC due to professional commitments with the Chicago Blackhawks, he played in the 2008 World Championships. He posted 10 points (three goals and seven assists) in seven games as the United States finished fifth.

Kane was selected to represent the United States in the 2010 Olympic Games in Vancouver, where he and the team won the silver medal. During the tournament he scored three goals and two assists in six games. Kane represented the United States again in the 2014 Olympic Games in Sochi. He missed two penalty shots in a loss against Finland in the bronze medal game.

On April 9, 2018, Kane was named the captain of Team USA for the 2018 IIHF World Championship. Kane scored two goals including a game winner in a 3–2 victory against the Czech Republic in the quarterfinals. The U.S. team finished the competition with the bronze medal after losing to Sweden in the semifinals but beating Canada. Kane finished the championships as the tournament's leading scorer with eight goals and 12 assists in 10 games. He was named the Most Valuable Player of 2018 Men's World Championship.

Personal life
Kane is the son of Patrick and Donna Kane. He has three sisters: Erica, Jessica, and Jacqueline. 
He attended Detroit Country Day School but left before graduating.

During the offseason, he lives in Hamburg, New York in a house on the shores of Lake Erie, which he purchased in March 2012. Kane has resided at the Trump International Hotel and Tower during the NHL season in a two-bedroom condo that he acquired in September 2008. However, Kane listed his Trump Tower condo for sale in the summer of 2016.

Kane has an endorsement deal with Bauer Hockey. He also appeared in commercials for McDonald's and Gatorade.

During his childhood, Kane was in the photo on Sylvain Turgeon's 1994-95 Pinnacle trading card, sitting with his father in the front row at the Buffalo Memorial Auditorium at a game between the Buffalo Sabres and Ottawa Senators, whom Turgeon was a member of at the time of the photo. Kane's father confirmed they were in the picture in a 2014 interview.

Kane and girlfriend, Amanda Grahovec, have one child together, a son also named Patrick, born in November 2020.

Charities
Kane participated in the Denis Savard Charity Golf Tournament in 2016. He played in an ice hockey game, Champs for Charity, which raised $323,000 for the Ronald McDonald House Charities of Chicagoland and Northwest Indiana in 2012.

Misdemeanor charges
On August 9, 2009, Kane and his cousin, James M. Kane, were arrested in Buffalo. According to a police report, Kane was apprehended around 5:00 a.m. after allegedly punching cab driver Jan Radecki when he claimed to not have proper change for their trip fare. Kane and his cousin's cab fare came out to be $14.80, and they gave him $15.00.

Kane was charged with second-degree robbery, fourth-degree criminal mischief, and theft of services. He pleaded not guilty. On August 17, Kane apologized for the distress he caused, saying he had been "at the wrong place at the wrong time," and mentioned his family, the Chicago Blackhawks organization, and their fan base—but not Radecki. Kane and his cousin appeared before a grand jury on August 19. While they were cleared of any felony charges, the two were still indicted on less severe misdemeanor assault, theft, and harassment charges. Kane and his cousin reiterated their not guilty pleas when appearing in court the next day. On August 27, Kane and cousin pleaded guilty to noncriminal disorderly conduct charges, and were both given conditional discharges, avoiding any penalties if they stayed out of trouble for a year, and also ordered to apologize to Radecki.

2015 police investigation
On August 6, 2015, the Buffalo News reported that Kane was the subject of a sexual assault investigation by police in Hamburg, New York in connection with an incident that allegedly occurred the previous weekend. The Erie County District Attorney's Office later declined to press charges against him, stating that the complainant's allegation was not sufficiently substantiated by credible evidence. It later came to light that the complainant's mother had orchestrated a hoax in which she attempted to make it appear as if critical evidence had been tampered with.

Career statistics

Regular season and playoffs
Bold indicates led league

International

Awards and achievements

References

External links

 

1988 births
Living people
American expatriate ice hockey players in Switzerland
American men's ice hockey right wingers
Art Ross Trophy winners
Calder Trophy winners
Chicago Blackhawks draft picks
Chicago Blackhawks players
Conn Smythe Trophy winners
Detroit Country Day School alumni
EHC Biel players
Hart Memorial Trophy winners
Ice hockey people from Buffalo, New York
Ice hockey players at the 2010 Winter Olympics
Ice hockey players at the 2014 Winter Olympics
London Knights players
Medalists at the 2010 Winter Olympics
National Hockey League All-Stars
National Hockey League first-overall draft picks
National Hockey League first-round draft picks
New York Rangers players
Olympic silver medalists for the United States in ice hockey
Stanley Cup champions
USA Hockey National Team Development Program players